The Niue Football Association is the governing body of association football on Niue. The association was founded in 2021 as a successor to the now-defunct Niue Island Soccer Association. The current President is Deve Talagi.

History 
In March 2021, following ten years of inactivity, the Niue Island Soccer Association was removed as an associate member of the Oceania Football Confederation for violations of multiple federation statutes. However, at the time of the announcement an OFC official indicated that they were aware of the formation of the new Niue Football Association and welcomed its application for associate membership.

In summer 2021 the NFA held its inaugural seven-a-side football season on the island with Deve Talagi, former vice-president of the NISA, serving as the organisation's president. The team from Vaiea won the first two editions of the men’s and women’s tournaments.

In February 2022 the association unveiled its new logo, created by local designer Fakaaue lahi Tom Jnr Misikea with funding support from the government of Niue.

National football stadium

References 

 
Association football governing bodies
Sports organizations established in 2021